Noop is a programming language from Google.

Noop or NOOP may also refer to:

 NOP (code) or NOOP, a computer processor instruction
 Noop scheduler, an I/O scheduler for the Linux kernel
 Noop, song by Bola from the album Kroungrine

See also
 National United Party (Vanuatu), pronounced as "noop"
 NOP (disambiguation)
 Knoop, a surname (including a list of persons with the name)